The Yorktown class may refer to:

 , a class of three steel-hulled gunboats of the United States Navy in the late 19th and early 20th centuries
 , a class of three aircraft carriers active before and during World War II